Castlemaine Perkins is a brewery at 185 Milton Road, Milton, Brisbane, Queensland, Australia. It is a wholly owned entity of the Japanese-controlled Lion company. Operations began in 1878 and continue today. Castlemaine Perkins is the home of the XXXX beer brand.

History

In 1877, brothers Nicholas Fitzgerald and Edward Fitzgerald partnered with a Brisbane commercial firm to buy the site of a failing distillery and establish a brewery, named for the Fitzgeralds' existing Castlemaine Brewery. They began to brew beer there in the following year and the brewery continues production to this day. The first beverage was called XXX Sparkling Ale.

In 1866, Patrick Perkins started the Perkins Brewery in Toowoomba. In 1872, he later extended his operations to Brisbane with the purchase of the City Brewery in 1872.

The company restricted its operations entirely to brewing by 1916.  XXXX was introduced with new advertising campaign in 1924 after the brewery employed German brewer, Alhois William Leitner.  The advertising included a depiction of a little man wearing a suit with a smile, a wink and a boater hat. The so-called 'Fourex Man' soon became one of the most recognised symbols in Queensland.

In 1928 (long after the death of Patrick Perkins in 1901), the Perkins brewing company was bought by the Castlemaine Brewery with new company being known as Castlemaine Perkins Limited.

In March 1980, Castlemaine Perkins merged with Tooheys to form Castlemaine Tooheys. Bond Corporation purchased Castlemaine Tooheys in 1985. Castlemaine Tooheys was acquired in 1992 by Lion Nathan.

Building
The large, brick brewery is located on Milton Road opposite the Milton railway station, and is a prominent landmark visible in the surrounding suburbs. In particular the XXXX red neon sign is mounted on the top of the building. The side of the building also a neon XXXX man on the side (visible on Milton Road when travelling out of the city).

The brewery building, Milton Railway Station and trains feature on almost all XXXX packaging directly below the XXXX logo.  Over the years bottle labels have depicted steam, diesel and electric trains. Tours of the brewery are regularly run for groups.

Awards 
In 2009 as part of the Q150 celebrations, the XXXX Brewery was announced as one of the Q150 Icons of Queensland for its role as a "structure and engineering feat".

Castlemaine Perkins was inducted into the Queensland Business Leaders Hall of Fame in 2009, for its significant contribution to economic development in Queensland.

Beverages
Castlemaine's signature beer, XXXX Bitter (despite its name a lager), was introduced in 1924. The XXXX had been used for a sparkling ale since 1878.

XXXX Summer Bright Lager is a 4.2% abv low carb pale lager.

See also

Australian pub
Beer in Australia
List of breweries in Australia
XXXX Island

References

Notes

Bibliography

External links
 Queensland Business Leaders Hall of Fame
 Castlemaine's History
 XXXX Review

Australian companies established in 1878
Food and drink companies established in 1878
Buildings and structures in Brisbane
Kirin Group
Australian beer brands
Manufacturing companies based in Brisbane
Beer brewing companies based in Queensland
Breweries in Australia
Q150 Icons